Aletta Jacobs: Het Hoogste Streven  is a 1995 Dutch documentary film directed by Nouchka van Brakel.

The docudrama tells the story of a Dutch female student and doctor, a feminist at heart, campaigner for women's suffrage and birth control Aletta Jacobs, played by Luutgard Willems and Hans Kesting has the role of CV Gerritsen.

The film was the result of an initiative by Aletta Jacobs Foundation which was set up specifically for this purpose. The premiere was in Sappemeer, the birthplace of Aletta Jacobs.

Only 4110 visitors paid for the ticket.

Cast
 Luutgard Willems ...  Aletta Jacobs
 Hans Kesting ...  C.V. Gerritsen
 Max Arian ...  Vader Jacobs
 Catherine ten Bruggencate ...  Moeder Jacobs
 Truus te Selle ...  Mademoiselle
 Edwin de Vries ...  Professor Rosenstein
 Sacha Bulthuis ...  Jeanette Broese van Groenou
 Anne Martien Lousberg ...  Meretrix
 Monic Hendrickx ...  Amsterdamse meretrix
 Hilt de Vos ...  Belgische feministe
 Krijn ter Braak ...  Hoogleraar
 Rijkent Vleeshouwer ...  Hoogleraar
 Albert van Ham ...  Hoogleraar
 Wigbolt Kruyver ...  Huwelijksbeambte
 Juul Vrijdag ...  Kiesvrouw

References

External links 
 

1995 films
1990s Dutch-language films
Dutch drama films
Dutch historical films
1990s historical films
Drama films based on actual events
1990s feminist films
Films set in the 1880s
Films set in the 1890s
Films set in the 1900s
Films set in the 1910s
Films set in the 1920s
Films set in the Netherlands
Films shot in the Netherlands
Films about activists
Cultural depictions of Dutch women
Cultural depictions of activists
1995 documentary films
Films directed by Nouchka van Brakel